Tatiana Matveeva may refer to:
 Tatiana Matveeva (footballer) (born 1990), Georgian footballer playing in Turkey
 Tatiana Matveeva (weightlifter) (born 1985), Russian weightlifter